Odo IV or Eudes IV (1295 – 3 April 1349) was Duke of Burgundy from 1315 until his death and Count of Burgundy and Artois between 1330 and 1347, as well as titular King of Thessalonica from 1316 to 1320. He was the second son of Duke Robert II and Agnes of France.

Life

Inheritances
Odo succeeded his elder brother, Hugh V, in 1315. Odo defended the rights of his niece Joan against Philip the Tall, another uncle, after Louis X's death in 1316. In 1318, Odo married Philip's eldest daughter, Joan III, Countess of Burgundy (1308 – 1347). Thus allying himself with Philip V, who had become king of France.

On the death of his brother, Louis in 1316, Odo became titular king of Thessalonica. By 1320, Odo was complaining to the pope of the Angevins' usurpation of Thessalonica, yet later sold his rights as King of Thessalonica and Prince of Achaea to Louis, Count of Clermont.

Odo's wife inherited the domains of her mother in 1330: the county of Artois and the county of Burgundy, the so-called Free County. Her claim to the County of Artois was challenged by Robert III of Artois, who at that time was a close friend and advisor of King Philip VI. The dispute ended abruptly when in December 1330 the documents used by Robert of Artois to support his claim were found to be forged on his instructions.

War with England
Odo was a loyal vassal of his brother-in-law, Philip of Valois, after he succeeded to the French throne as Philip VI. He belonged to Philip VI’s small circle of trusted advisors. He fought in many theatres of French warfare: the Low Countries, Brittany, Aquitaine. He fought the Flemings and was wounded at the Battle of Cassel in 1328.

In 1340, Odo first fought in Hainaut, helped capture the town of Antoing and later defended Saint-Omer in the battle there against Robert III of Artois. During the summer the French government became aware of plans for an Anglo-Flemish army under Robert of Artois to attack on Saint-Omer. The Duke entered Saint-Omer 15 July with several thousands men-at-arms and begun preparing the defences of the city. The slow progress of the English army also allowed further reinforcements led by John I, Count of Armagnac to arrive. On 26 July Robert of Artois offered battle to the garrison of Saint-Omer. Contrary to orders some hotheads charged out, their attack was beaten off, but their flight caused the Flemings to abandon their defensive works in pursuit. The Duke of Burgundy now decided to sally with the Count of Armagnac. During the battle the Duke got into a fierce fight with the English and Brugeois contingents and barely escaped back behind the walls. Meanwhile, however the Count of Armagnac had scattered the enemy left flank. The loss of most of his Flemish troops forced Robert of Artois to flee back to Flanders.

He took part in the War of the Breton Succession as a partisan of Charles of Blois serving as advisor to his nephew John, Duke of Normandy, during the latter’s campaign in Brittany autumn 1341.

He served together with the Duke of Normandy and the Chancellor of France, Guillaume Flote, as French ambassadors to a peace conference at Avignon summer 1344. The conference was however actively sabotaged by the English. Henry, Earl of Derby who had been announced has the head of the English delegation, claimed once he arrived at Avignon to be there only in a private capacity for devotional reasons and the minor English officials who were officially there had no instructions.

In 1346, he was in Guyenne combatting the English. Spring that year the French government decided to field its so far strongest army in the south-west. The Duke of Burgundy followed John of Normandy south together with a substantial number of northern nobles and such dignitaries as Raoul II of Brienne, Count of Eu the Constable of France, both Marshals and the Master of Crossbowmen. In April Normandy laid siege to the town of Aiguillon which controlled the confluence between the Lot and the Garonne. There they still remained in August when John of Normandy was urgently recalled to the north to help stop Edward III who had landed in Normandy. The French 1346 campaign in the south ended having accomplished nothing.

In September Edward III laid siege to Calais. As Artois became the main theatre of the war, relations between the Duke and King Philip VI plummeted. The Duke governed Artois on behalf of his wife, but the royal government increasingly disregarded local officials and even began making its own appointments. In December 1346 Philip suspended the Duke’s government altogether.

Death and legacy
Odo was present at the coronation of Pope Clement VI at Avignon 19 May 1342.

Perhaps the greatest legacy of Odo IV is seen in the subsequent Burgundian court of the Valois dukes, for Odo was a patron of the arts and the church and sponsored many young artists. He also endeavoured for good political connections and by marrying a French royal princess assured the good relations with the king. The premature death of his son Philip made his four-year-old grandson the heir presumptive. He succeeded Odo IV as Philip I after Odo died of the plague. Most sources place his death at Sens, on Friday, 3 April 1349. Some sources give the year as 1350.

Family

Children
By his wife Joan III, Odo had six sons, most of whom died young:
a stillborn son (1322)
Philip (1323–1346), Count of Auvergne
John (1325–1327 or 1328)
three sons who died young, born in 1327, 1330, and 1335

Portrayal in film
Odo (as Eudes) is a supporting character in Les Rois maudits (The Accursed Kings), a series of French historical novels by Maurice Druon.

References

Sources

Further reading

Anne-Lise Courtel, "La chancellerie et les actes d'Eudes IV, duc de Bourgogne (1315–1349)", Bibliothèque de l'école des chartes, 135, 1 (1977): 23–71.
Anne-Lise Courtel, "La chancellerie et les actes d'Eudes IV, duc de Bourgogne (1315-1349) (second article)", Bibliothèque de l'école des chartes, 135, 1 (1977): 255–311.

1295 births
1349 deaths
House of Burgundy
Titular Kings of Thessalonica
Princes of Achaea
Dukes of Burgundy
Counts of Burgundy
Counts of Artois
14th-century deaths from plague (disease)
14th-century peers of France